Francis P. McCloskey (July 22, 1917 – July 1, 2010) was an American politician who served in the New York State Assembly from 1955 to 1964 and from 1966 to 1970.

He died on July 1, 2010, in Frederick, Maryland at age 92.

References

1917 births
2010 deaths
Republican Party members of the New York State Assembly